Quebrada Grande is a barrio in the municipality of Barranquitas, Puerto Rico. Its population in 2010 was 3,217.

History
Puerto Rico was ceded by Spain in the aftermath of the Spanish–American War under the terms of the Treaty of Paris of 1898 and became an unincorporated territory of the United States. In 1899, the United States Department of War conducted a census of Puerto Rico finding that the population of Quebrada Grande barrio was 931.

Special community
Since 2001 when law 1-2001 was passed, measures have been taken to identify and address the high levels of poverty and the lack of resources and opportunities affecting specific communities in Puerto Rico. Initially there were 686 places that made the list. The places on the list are barrios, communities, sectors, or neighborhoods and in 2004, Quebrada Grande made the list. In 2017, the director of the Special Communities of Puerto Rico program stated that the program was evolving with more ways to help the residents of these marginalized communities.

See also

 List of communities in Puerto Rico

References

External links

Barrios of Barranquitas, Puerto Rico